Royal Consort Geun of the Goseong Yi clan was a Korean royal consort as the first wife of U of Goryeo and the mother of his successor, King Chang. She was the fourth Goryeo queen who didn't receive a posthumous name like the other consorts following Lady Yun.

Biography

Early life
The future Royal Consort Geun was born in the Goseong Yi clan in Goseong County as the daughter of Lee Rim, who was a relative of Lee In-im (이인임), and Lady Hong.

Marriage and palace life
In 1379, she became the consort of the 13-year-old U of Goryeo and then given title as Consort Geun (근비, 謹妃), also lived in Hudeok Mansion (후덕부, 厚德府). Since their daughter was now a Royal wife, Lee Rim then honoured as "Internal Prince Cheolseong" (철성부원군, 鐵城府院君) and his wife became "Lady of Byeonhan State" (변한국부인, 卞韓國夫人). Two felons were released from prison to mark the occasion.

In September 1380, she gave birth to a prince, the future King Chang, and one felon was released to celebrate. King U's third consort, Royal Consort Ui of the No clan was originally one of her maids but was promoted in 1382.

After King U of Goryeo's deposal
In 1388, after ordering an attack on Liaodong in Ming territory, King U was forced to abdicate during a coup led by the general Yi Seong-gye. His young son ascended the throne as King Chang with Yi Seong-gye as regent, and Royal Consort Geun was promoted to Grand Royal Consort. All of the former king's other consorts were forced to leave the palace and return to their natal homes. 

Little more than a year later, both King Chang and his father were demoted to commoner status with the justification that U had not actually been the son of his royal father, and Gongyang of Goryeo was enthroned as the new ruler. In addition to her husband and son, Royal Consort Geun's father and brother were exiled, as well as two of her brothers-in-law, a  nephew-in-law, and a nephew. Late in 1389, the two former kings were killed, and Royal Consort Geun's father was imprisoned in Cheongju.

Family
Father: Yi Rim (이림, 李琳; d. 1391)
Mother: Lady Hong of Byeonhan State (변한국부인 홍씨, 卞韓國夫人 洪氏)
Older sister: Lady Yi (이씨, 李氏) – married a man from the Incheon Yi clan.
Nephew: Lee Mun-hwa, Duke Gongdo (공도공 이문화, 恭度公 李文和; 1358–1414) – married Lady Choe of the Chungju Choe clan (충주최씨, 忠州崔氏)
Grandniece: Grand Internal Princess Consort Heungnyeong of the Incheon Yi clan (흥녕부대부인 인천 이씨, 興寧府大夫人 仁川 李氏; 1383–1456)
Grandnephew-in-law: Yun Beon, Duke Jeongjeong, Internal Prince Papyeong (파평부원군 정정공 윤번, 坡平府院君 貞靖公 尹璠; 1384–1448) – became the father of Queen Jeonghui (정희왕후; 1418–1483)
Husband: King U of Goryeo (고려 우왕; 1365–1389)
Son: King Chang of Goryeo (고려 창왕; 1380–1389)

In popular culture
 Portrayed by Jung Sun-ae in the 1983 KBS1 TV series Foundation of the Kingdom.
 Portrayed by Kim Chang-sook in the 1983 MBC TV series The King of Chudong Palace.
 Portrayed by Seo Yi-an in the 2014 KBS TV series Jeong Do-jeon.

Notes

References

External links
근비 이씨 on Doosan Encyclopedia .
근비 이씨 on Encykorea .

14th-century Korean people
Royal consorts of the Goryeo Dynasty
14th-century Korean women
Year of birth unknown
Goseong Lee clan
People from South Gyeongsang Province